Under Cover is an American secret agent drama series that premiered on ABC on January 7, 1991. The series starred Anthony John Denison and Linda Purl as Dylan and Kate Del'Amico, a husband and wife who share the same day job—as spies for a fictional U.S. intelligence agency.

Under Cover follows the couple's adventures as they attempt to balance the demands of a sometimes deadly profession while raising two children. The series co-starred John Rhys-Davies as Flynn, the team's gadget man (analogous to James Bond's Q) who is also a deadly assassin.

Although well received by critics and launched with a high-rated made-for-TV movie, Under Cover was adversely affected by the outbreak of the 1991 Persian Gulf War. A two-part episode had been produced involving the Del'Amicos infiltrating Iraq in the wake of its invasion of Kuwait, and culminated with an American military strike on the country. The night the second episode was scheduled to air, real-life hostilities erupted. The series aired in subsequent weeks but was cancelled after just over a month on the air.

Characters
Dylan Del'Amico (Anthony Denison)
Kate Del'Amico (Linda Purl)
Flynn (John Rhys-Davies)
Graham Parker (John Slattery)
Alex Robbins (Kasi Lemmons)
Stewart Merriman (Josef Sommer)
Megan (Arlene Taylor)
Grimbach (Raye Birk)
Marlon Del'Amico (Adam Ryan)
Emily Del'Amico (Marnette Patterson)
Director Waugh (G. W. Bailey)
Dr. Lee (Michael Paul Chan)
Col. Kalganin (Paul Freeman)
Bing Tupper (Randolph Mantooth)

Episodes

References

External links
 
 
 

1990s American drama television series
1991 American television series debuts
1991 American television series endings
American Broadcasting Company original programming
English-language television shows
Espionage television series